Mínor Díaz Araya  (born 26 December 1980 in Acoyapa) is a retired Costa Rican professional footballer and current manager of Fútbol Consultants Desamparados.

Club career
Díaz had a brief spell with Karlsruher SC in the German 2. Fußball-Bundesliga during the 1999-00 season, appearing in six matches. He then had a lengthy spell at Herediano where he became the league's top goalscorer in 2000/01 and played for Alajuelense and Cartaginés. In May 2008 he moved to Liberia Mia, he then sued his club which was renamed Águilas Guanacastecas for owing him 4 months' wages and in summer 2010 joined UCR.

In January 2012 he returned to Herediano, winning two league titles, and in summer 2014 joined Belén.

International career
Díaz played for Costa Rica at the 1997 FIFA U-17 World Cup finals in Egypt and at the 1999 FIFA U-20 World Cup finals in Nigeria.

Díaz has made 6 appearances for the senior Costa Rica national football team, his debut coming in a friendly against Venezuela on April 18, 2001. He appeared in four matches as Costa Rica finished second at the UNCAF Nations Cup 2001 tournament.

Coaching career
Two months after signing with A.D. Belén, Díaz decided to retire after getting offered an assistant manager position at his former club C.S. Herediano. On 16 February 2016, Díaz took charge of Herediano on an interim basis after manager Odir Jacques was fired until Hernán Medford was hired on 21 February. In the summer 2018, he took charge of the club's reserve team, before he was appointed manager of La U Universitarios on 30 October 2018. On 23 September 2019 the club reported through a press release, that Díaz had left the club by mutual agreement.

On 1 October 2019, Díaz was appointed manager of Fútbol Consultants Desamparado.

Career statistics

International goals
Scores and results list. Costa Rica's goal tally first.

References

External links
 
 Profile at Nacion 

1980 births
Living people
People from Guanacaste Province
Association football forwards
Costa Rican men's footballers
Costa Rican expatriate footballers
Costa Rica international footballers
Costa Rica under-20 international footballers
Liga FPD players
Karlsruher SC players
C.S. Herediano footballers
L.D. Alajuelense footballers
C.S. Cartaginés players
Municipal Liberia footballers
C.F. Universidad de Costa Rica footballers
Belén F.C. players
Costa Rican expatriate sportspeople in Germany
Expatriate footballers in Germany
2001 UNCAF Nations Cup players
C.S. Herediano managers
Costa Rican football managers